Janibacter anophelis is a species of Gram positive, strictly aerobic, bacterium. The species was initially isolated from the midgut of a  Anopheles arabiensis mosquito. The species was first described in 2006, and the species name is derived from the mosquito genus Anopheles.

The optimum growth temperature for J. anophelis is 35 °C, and can grow in the 20-40 °C range.

References

Intrasporangiaceae
Bacteria described in 2006